Scenic Drive is the first mixtape by American singer Khalid, released on December 3, 2021, by RCA Records. Originally planned to release as an extended play, Khalid tweeted shortly after announcing Scenic Drive that "this is no longer an EP, it's way more special to me".

Singles
The lead single from the mixtape, "Present" was released on October 22, 2021.

Critical reception
A.D. Amorosi of Variety called it "a pulsating, minor marvel of  economical soul-hop that satisfies all that Khalid fanatics have come to crave - that high dozy warble, those out-of-the-blue hooks - while pushing his new-found exigency (and lower range) into the future."

Track listing

Charts

References 

2021 albums
Khalid (singer) albums